The men's triathlon was part of the Triathlon at the 2004 Summer Olympics programme. It was the second appearance of the event, which was established in 2000.  The competition was held on Thursday, August 26, 2004 at the Vouliagmeni Olympic Centre in Athens. Fifty triathletes from 26 nations competed.

Competition format
The race was held over the "international distance" (also called "Olympic distance") and consisted of  swimming, road cycling, and  road running.

Results

* Including Transition 1 (swimming-to-cycling) and T2 (cycling-to-running), roughly a minute. 
No one is allotted the number 13.
LAP - Lapped by the leader on the cycling course..

References

External links
 Athens 2004 triathlon results at Yahoo! Sports

Triathlon at the 2004 Summer Olympics
Olympics
Vouliagmeni Olympic Centre events
Men's events at the 2004 Summer Olympics